Hunter Kampmoyer (born February 6, 1998) is an American football tight end for the Los Angeles Chargers of the National Football League (NFL). He played college football for the Oregon Ducks.

College career
Kampmoyer was a member of the Oregon Ducks for five seasons, redshirting his true freshman season. He finished his collegiate career with 20 receptions for 224 yards and four touchdowns in 45 games played.

Professional career
Kampmoyer was signed by the Los Angeles Chargers as an undrafted free agent on May 1, 2021. He was waived during final roster cuts on August 31, 2021, but was signed to the team's practice squad the next day. Kampmoyer was elevated to the active roster on January 2, 2022, for the team's Week 17 game against the Denver Broncos and made his NFL debut in the game. He signed a reserve/future contract with the Chargers on January 11, 2022.

On August 30, 2022, Kampmoyer was waived by the Chargers and signed to the practice squad the next day. He signed a reserve/future contract on January 17, 2023.

References

External links
Oregon Ducks bio
Los Angeles Chargers bio

1998 births
Living people
American football tight ends
Oregon Ducks football players
People from Bishop, California
Los Angeles Chargers players
Players of American football from California